Ragini MMS 2 is a 2014 Indian erotic horror thriller film directed by Bhushan Patel and co-produced by Jayasinh Gupta and Sunil Maurya Pradhaan under Balaji Motion Pictures and ALT Entertainment. The movie is the sequel to the 2011 horror movie Ragini MMS. Ragini MMS 2 features Sunny Leone and Saahil Prem in lead roles in a continuation of the plot from the prequel. Unlike the first film, the movie is not shot in a found footage format. The film received an A certificate.The film was a major commercial success, being declared a hit at the box office, and catapulted Sunny into the general public conscious in India as a mainstream actress.

Plot 
The film begins where the previous film ended. Ragini since that incident has been at Thane Mental Asylum and even there she has been disturbed by the ghost of that house where she went. Meanwhile, Ragini's MMS tape has gone viral - along with rumours of the house's haunted nature, where the MMS was filmed. This catches the attention of a sleazy director, Rocks (Parvin Dabas) who decides to make a movie on the haunting. He signs an ex-porn star, Sunny Leone (Sunny Leone) as the lead actress and decides to shoot the movie in the same house where the MMS was recorded.

Sunny, who takes an instant liking to the script, seeks permission to meet the real Ragini (Kainaz Motivala), (who is now in a mental asylum), to get a better in-depth look of the character she wants to portray. But the meeting goes horribly wrong when Ragini stabs herself brutally in the neck.

Later, the cast and crew arrive at the haunted house to shoot and strange things begin to happen, especially to Sunny. Elsewhere, Dr. Meera Dutta (Divya Dutta), a psychiatrist who specialises in cases for which science has no answers, takes up Ragini's case. After going through old news paper clipping and video tapes of Ragini, she finds the truth regarding the haunting.

She finds out that the ghost haunting the house, in life was a married woman with two daughters and a son. She loved her son more than her daughters since she had conceived him after much difficulty and praying. One day, the boy and his two sisters were playing hide and seek when the boy slipped into a well and drowned. This drove his mother insane and caused her to embark on a desperate quest to resurrect him from the dead. A Baba who claimed to perform black magic arrived and convinced her the only way to bring her son back was to sacrifice both of her daughters. The insane mother agreed and the Baba chopped off the daughters' heads. He put the sword in her hands, told her to close her eyes, and chant. While she did that he stole all of her money and ran. When the villagers finally arrived, they assumed that the mother was practising witchcraft and punished her by hanging her from a tree, stoning her, and burning her alive. The woman survived, finally dropped from the tree, and after cursing them all, killed herself by stabbing herself in the neck with the rattle-toy her son used to play with.

Dr. Dutta then rushes to the shooting location to inform the cast and crew to abandon their shooting and leave the house immediately. But it is too late as the ghost has already possessed Sunny and started killing the film's cast and crew by either luring them into having sex or killing them by catching them off guard. Only the scriptwriter Satya (Saahil Prem) and actress Monali (Sandhya Mridul) are left alive.

As Dr. Dutta, Monali and Satya attempt to drive the ghost out of Sunny, Monali gets killed. Afterwards, when Satya accidentally steps on the rattle toy with which the woman committed suicide prior to becoming a ghost, it causes Sunny temporary pain, and thereby forces the ghost to temporarily leave Sunny. Dr. Dutta realises the toy's importance and urges Satya to destroy it. Eventually the ghost is destroyed along with the rattle. And Sunny, Satya and Dr. Dutta leave the house, having exorcised the ghost and solving the mystery behind the haunting. At the end of the movie a rocking chair is shown rocking back and forth and a child's voice is heard, signifying that there is still a ghost in the house.

Cast
 Sunny Leone as herself
 Saahil Prem as Satya Kumar
 Anita Hassanandani as Gina
 Sandhya Mridul as Monali
 Karan Veer Mehra as Maddy
 Parvin Dabas as Rocks
 Divya Dutta as Dr. Meera Dutta
 Soniya Mehra as Tanya Kapoor
 Karan Taluja as Kunal Khanna
 Geetanjali Kulkarni as the Witch / Ghost
 Kainaz Motivala as Ragini (Cameo)
 Yo Yo Honey Singh as the special appearance in song "Chaar Botal Vodka"
 Shilpa Gandhi Mohile  as Doctor in a special appearance

Production
Sunny Leone, who plays female lead in Ragini MMS 2, says this movie is more commercial in nature than its prequel.
Director Bhushan Patel says that there is a lot more sex, scares and a lot of glamour with the songs. The movie was scheduled to be released in the month of October 2013. However, Balaji Motion Pictures officially confirmed the release date, scheduled to be on 17 January 2014. The release date of the film was further postponed to 21 March 2014.

Soundtrack

The soundtrack of Ragini MMS 2 is composed by Meet Bros Anjjan, Yo Yo Honey Singh, Pranay Rijia & Chirantan Bhatt.

The first song "Baby Doll" featuring Sunny Leone was released on YouTube receiving great response and went on to be a chartbuster. The song's video is heavily inspired by the track "Dance Again" by Jennifer Lopez from the album Dance Again... The Hits. The second song "Chaar Botal Vodka" featuring Sunny Leone along with Honey Singh was also a great success receiving more than 5 million views in 5 days.

Track listing

Release

Critical reception
Madhureeta Mukherjee of the Times of India rated the movie 3.5 out 5 and said, "The film provides the usual creepy cliches – creaking windows, ghostly shadows and bedraggled ghosts. There are a few spooky moments, but fewer leap-out-of-your-seat scenes. Sunny looks deathly desirable and plays the sexed-up baby doll with abandon. While her 'act' is good, her 'performance' doesn't really climax. Yet, she gives us a 'drool-worthy' adult-horror film – one of its kind for Bollywood."

Mohar Basu of Koimoi rated the movie 3 out 5 concluding, "Ragini MMS 2 is quite a pleasant surprise. It is not everyday that you begin your morning watching a Sunny Leone film, where she actually manages to bewilder you something close to a performance. Interestingly threaded with ample hair raising minutes, the film's ability to seem unrelentingly real is what makes it an entertaining watch. Not worth an Oscar but worth spending your popcorn over this weekend for sure."

Shubhra Gupta of The Indian Express rated the movie 2.5 out 5 stating, "Despite its harum-scarum script and barely-there logic, I quite enjoyed 'Ragini MMS 2' in the portions when Sunny Leone is in full stride.Where it falters is in the lack of novelty in the scenes that feature the spirit, and its bloody trail: there are a couple of scenes that send a shiver down your spine, but then it all becomes familiar. A little more attention to that, and to the storyline, and this will become a solid franchise."

Namita Karkera of Rediff.com gave the film a score of 1.5 out of 5 noting, "Sunny Leone looks hot alright but with scary scenes being average at best, Ragini MMS 2 isn't half as scary as it is supposed to be. At best, the film seems like a spoof. The second half of the movie however fares better. Overall the movie still manages to scare at some shots, make us laugh and enjoy Sunny Leone in her skimpy outfits."

Box office

Domestic
Ragini MMS 2 had a very strong opening day with the film collecting 80 million despite competition from T20 World Cup but some how managed an opening weekend of 240 million. Despite the strong opening and Good reviews as an adult film the movie unfortunately buffered in its 2nd week and collected hardly 65 million. The film continued with a rapid rise and fall in its 3rd week by collecting almost 70 million and a total of about 470 million from the three weeks

Controversy
The movie was not launched in Pakistan because the authorities there believed that it violated the viewership laws of Pakistan as it contained a lot of adult content. The ban had the potential to impact the film's revenue as box-office take from Pakistan (which can make up to 8% of the average movie's earnings) was restricted as a result.

Awards and nominations

References

External links
 
 

2014 horror thriller films
2014 films
2014 horror films
Films directed by Bhushan Patel
Indian ghost films
Indian haunted house films
2010s Hindi-language films
Indian LGBT-related films
Indian horror thriller films
Indian erotic thriller films
Indian erotic horror films
Films about filmmaking
Films about actors
Films about curses
Indian sequel films
Balaji Motion Pictures films